Chyornaya is a rural locality (a village) in Shemogodskoye Rural Settlement, Velikoustyugsky District, Vologda Oblast, Russia. The population was 17 as of 2002.

Geography 
Chyornaya is located 15 km southeast of Veliky Ustyug (the district's administrative centre) by road. Bakharevo is the nearest rural locality.

References 

Rural localities in Velikoustyugsky District